Le Monde en stop, 5 années à l'école de la vie is the first travelbook of Ludovic Hubler, published in 2009 at Georama edition. In this book, he summarizes his tour of the world by hitchhiking, which he did between 2003 and 2008. This book was awarded the "Prix Pierre Loti", the best travel book of the year 2009 in France.

Presentation 

After graduating from the Business school of Strasbourg (France) in June 2002, Ludovic Hubler believed that discovering the realities of the world was a prerequisite before opening himself to professional life.

24 years old when he graduated, he decided to leave on January 1, 2003 for what he calls his "tour of mankind" or his "life PHd" : A tour of the world done only by hitchhiking, using no bus, no train, no taxi and no plane.

His adventure will take him 5 years. From "Sailing-boat Hitchhiking" to cross among others the Atlantic and Pacific oceans to "Ice-breaker Hitchhiking" to reach Antarctica or crossing the Sahara desert or countries like Colombia and Afghanistan, Ludovic has thumbed in all types of imaginable situations.

During his trip, he met among others the 14th Dalai-Lama, who received him in his home in Dharamsala in India or thousands of students while giving lectures in various institutions (schools, universities, etc.).

5 years of travelling, 170,000 km travelled, 59 countries crossed, hundreds of lectures given and the help of over 1,300 drivers give an idea of the magnitude of his journey.

Award 
Le Monde en stop, 5 années à l'école de la vie was rewarded with the "Prix Pierre Loti" 2010, the best travel book of the year 2009.

External links
 The official web site of the book "Le Monde en Stop, 5 années à l'école de la vie"
 The official web site of Ludovic Hubler

2009 non-fiction books
French travel books
Hitchhiking